Donald Shepard Hewitt (December 14, 1922 – August 19, 2009) was an American television news producer and executive, best known for creating the CBS television news magazine 60 Minutes in 1968, which at the time of his death was the longest-running prime-time broadcast on American television. Under Hewitt's leadership, 60 Minutes was the only news program ever rated as the nation's top-ranked television program, an achievement it accomplished five times. Hewitt produced the first televised presidential debate in 1960.

Early life
Hewitt was born in New York City, New York, the son of Frieda (née Pike) and Ely S. Hewitt (changed from Hurwitz or Horowitz). His father was a Jewish immigrant from Russia, and his mother's family was of German Jewish descent. Hewitt's family moved to Boston, Massachusetts, shortly after his birth, where his father worked as a classified advertising manager for the Boston Herald American. His family later lived in Milwaukee, Wisconsin. He graduated from New Rochelle High School, in New Rochelle, New York.

College and early career
Hewitt attended New York University and started his journalism career in 1942 as head copyboy for the New York Herald Tribune. He joined the United States Merchant Marine Academy in 1943 and served as a journalist for Stars and Stripes in London. Hewitt later returned to sea as an ensign in the Naval Reserve. After World War II ended in 1945, Hewitt returned to his job as copyboy for the Tribune, then worked for The Associated Press at a bureau in Memphis, Tennessee. However, his wife Mary Weaver—whom he married while working in Memphis—wanted to go to New York City, so he moved back.

Back in New York City, Hewitt started working at the E.W. Scripps Company-owned photo agency ACME Newspictures, which was later merged into co-owned news service United Press

Career at CBS News
Hewitt soon received a lucrative offer at the CBS television network, which was seeking someone who had "picture experience" to help with production of television broadcast. He began working at its news division, CBS News, in 1948 and was producer-director of the network's evening-news broadcast with Douglas Edwards for fourteen years. 

He was also the first director of See It Now, co-produced by host Edward R. Murrow and Fred W. Friendly which started in 1951; his use of "two film projectors cutting back and forth breaks up the monotony of a talking head, improves editing, and shapes future news broadcasts." In 1956, Hewitt was the only one to capture on film the final moments of the SS Andrea Doria as it sank and disappeared under the water. He directed the televised production of the first 1960 U.S. Presidential candidate debate between Senator John F. Kennedy and Vice-President Richard M. Nixon on September 26, 1960, at the CBS studios in Chicago. It was the first presidential-candidate debate ever televised. He later became executive producer of the CBS Evening News with Walter Cronkite, helming the famous broadcast of John F. Kennedy's assassination as the story developed.
He then launched the eight-time Emmy Award-winning show 60 Minutes. Within ten years, the show reached the top 10 in viewership, a position it maintained for 21 of the following 22 seasons, until the 1999–2000 season.

Hewitt was a primary figure in the televising of a 1996 60 Minutes documentary on the tobacco-industry scandal involving the tobacco company Brown & Williamson, in which the program eventually reported the allegations of whistleblower Jeffrey Wigand. Initially wary of a lawsuit, Hewitt sided with CBS News management and killed the Wigand story by censoring the interview. After blowback, a more complete presentation of the story was allowed to air, but the handling of the issue remained "a dark, sorry period in the otherwise virtuous life of '60 Minutes.'" The overall scandal was the inspiration for the 1999 film The Insider. Hewitt was portrayed in the film by Philip Baker Hall.

Declining ratings at 60 Minutes—after decades of being in the top 10, the show had dropped in rankings to number 20—contributed to what became a public debate in 2002 about whether it was time for CBS to replace Hewitt at 60 Minutes. According to The New York Times, Jeff Fager, producer of 60 Minutes II, was being floated as a possible replacement, speculation that proved to be accurate. The show was still generating an estimated profit of more than $20 million a year, but the decline in viewership and profit meant the show could no longer "operate as an island unto itself, often thumbing its nose at management while demanding huge salaries and perquisites." Within a couple of years, Hewitt stepped aside as executive producer at the age of 81, signing a ten-year contract with CBS to be an executive producer-at-large for CBS News.

In January 2010, 60 Minutes dedicated an entire show to the story and memory of Don Hewitt.

In 2018, an internal CBS investigation found that in the 1990s Hewitt had been accused of repeatedly sexually assaulting a former CBS employee over a period of years. CBS determined that the employee's allegations were credible and by 2018 had paid her over $5 million in settlements in exchange for her silence.

Personal life and death
Hewitt was married three times:
Mary Weaver with whom he had two sons: Jeffrey and Steven.
Frankie Teague Hewitt - American theater producer and founder of the Ford's Theatre Society who was responsible for restoring and reopening the historic site as a working theater. They had a daughter: Lisa Gabrielle Hewitt Cassara, former coordinating producer of the syndicated television show "A Current Affair"; and he adopted her daughter Jilian Childers from a previous marriage.
Marilyn Berger - American broadcast and newspaper journalist. Through Berger, Hewitt is the great-uncle of Rob Fishman.

In March 2009, Hewitt was diagnosed with pancreatic cancer from which he died on August 19, 2009, at his home in Bridgehampton, New York.

Honors
1987: Hewitt received the Paul White Award, Radio Television Digital News Association
1988: In addition to several Peabody Awards given to 60 Minutes, Hewitt was given a personal Peabody Award, for his accomplishments that have "touch[ed] the lives of just about every American."
1989: Inducted into The Television Academy Hall Of Fame
1992: Hewitt won the Walter Cronkite Award for Excellence in Journalism.
1993: Hewitt and 60 Minutes were elected to the National Association of Broadcasters Hall of Fame.
2008: Hewitt was honored with Washington State University's Edward R. Murrow Award for Lifetime Achievement in Broadcast Journalism.

Bibliography

In 1985, Random House published Minute by Minute, a look at the history of 60 Minutes. In 2001, PublicAffairs published Tell Me a Story: Fifty Years and 60 Minutes in Television, in which Hewitt chronicles his life as a newsman.

References

External links

1922 births
2009 deaths
20th-century American businesspeople
American expatriates in the United Kingdom
American people of German-Jewish descent
American people of Russian-Jewish descent
American television news producers
Businesspeople from New Rochelle, New York
Deaths from cancer in New York (state)
Deaths from pancreatic cancer
Emmy Award winners
International Emmy Founders Award winners
Peabody Award winners
People from Bridgehampton, New York
Television producers from New York (state)
United States Merchant Mariners
United States Merchant Mariners of World War II
United States Navy officers
United States Navy personnel of World War II
United States Navy reservists
New Rochelle High School alumni